Pozzobon is a surname. Notable people with the surname include:
 Barbara Pozzobon (born 1993), Italian swimmer
 John Pozzobon (1904–1985), Brazilian Roman Catholic deacon